The Elkader Keystone Bridge is a historic structure located in Elkader, Iowa, United States. The old iron truss bridge that crossed the  Turkey River at this location was declared unsafe in 1888. The Clayton County Board of Supervisors decided to construct a bridge of native limestone as way of saving money and providing a reliable crossing. Engineer M. Tschirgi designed the structure and Dubuque stonemasons Byrne and Blade constructed the bridge. A sidewalk was added on the north side of the structure in 1924. The bridge was individually listed on the National Register of Historic Places in 1976.

See also
List of bridges documented by the Historic American Engineering Record in Iowa

References

External links

Bridges completed in 1889
Elkader, Iowa
Historic American Engineering Record in Iowa
Bridges in Clayton County, Iowa
National Register of Historic Places in Clayton County, Iowa
Road bridges on the National Register of Historic Places in Iowa
Arch bridges in Iowa
Stone arch bridges in the United States